State Highway 50 (SH 50) is a New Zealand state highway that runs through the Hawke's Bay Region.

Route
SH 50 begins at the Port of Napier travelling down Breakwater Road, Ahuriri Bypass and Hyderabad Road turning west onto Prebensen Drive. At the intersection with Links Road it turns west, leaving the expressway and continuing on rural road via Fernhill, Maraekakaho and Tikokino before terminating at SH 2 near Takapau.

Major intersections

Spur section

State Highway 50A (SH 50A) was a spur section covering the southern section of the Hawke's Bay Expressway. It covered from the intersection of Links Road at SH 50, traveling in a general south-west direction between Hastings and Flaxmere and terminated at the intersection of Paki Paki Road and Railway Road. SH 2 took over this designation in 2019.

See also
 List of New Zealand state highways

References

External links
 New Zealand Transport Agency

50
Transport in the Hawke's Bay Region